Grannis (variation Granniss) is a surname. Notable people with the surname include:

Elizabeth Bartlett Grannis (1840–1926), American editor, publisher and suffragist
Kina Grannis (born 1985), American singer-songwriter
LeRoy Grannis (1917–2011), American photographer
Susanna Grannis (born 1937), American academic
Paul Grannis (born 1938), American physicist
Pete Grannis (born 1942/1943), American politician
Ruth S. Granniss (1872-1954), American librarian
George N. Granniss (1826-1895), American photographer